Pohlig is the surname of:

 Karl Pohlig (1864 – 1928), German conductor
 Stephen Pohlig, electrical engineer currently working at MIT Lincoln Laboratory